Tony Joe White was the fourth album released by Tony Joe White, and the first he released for Warner Bros. Records. It was produced by Peter Asher and recorded between December 1–12, 1970 at Sounds of Memphis Studio and Ardent Recording Studio, Memphis (engineered by Terry Manning).

Track listing
All tracks composed by Tony Joe White, except where indicated

Side one
 "They Caught The Devil and Put Him in Jail in Eudora, Arkansas"
 "The Change"
 "My Kind of Woman"
 "The Daddy"
 "Black Panther Swamps"

Side two
 "Five Summers For Jimmy"
 "A Night in the Life of a Swamp Fox"
 "Traveling Bone"
 "I Just Walked Away"
 "Copper Kettle" (Albert Frank Beddoe)
 "Voodoo Village"

Personnel
Tony Joe White - guitar, harmonica
Robert McGuffie - bass
Sammy Creason - drums
Mike Utley - piano, organ
Memphis Horns:
Wayne Jackson - trumpet
Andrew Love - tenor saxophone
James Mitchell - baritone saxophone
Jack Hale - trombone
Louis Collins - tenor
Roger Hopps - trumpet
String arrangements by Roger Hopps
Horn arrangements by the Memphis Horns

References

1971 albums
Tony Joe White albums
Warner Records albums
Albums produced by Peter Asher
Swamp rock albums